was a Japanese diplomat, legal scholar and writer.

Mission to China
 659-661 envoy to China on behalf of Empress Saimei.
 667-668 he went to China on behalf of Emperor Tenji, travelling with Kasa no Moroishi (笠諸石?) to the court of the Gaozong, Emperor of China. On his return voyage to Japan, he escorted Tang emissary Sima Facong (司馬法聰) to the army stationed at the old Baekje garrison.

Notes

References
 Fogel, Joshua A. (2009). Articulating the Sinosphere: Sino-Japanese Relations in Space and Time. Cambridge: Harvard University Press.  
 Nussbaum, Louis Frédéric and Käthe Roth. (2005). Japan Encyclopedia. Cambridge: Harvard University Press.  OCLC 48943301

External links
 日本書紀　卷廿六　齊明紀 (Chinese)

Japanese ambassadors to the Tang dynasty
Year of birth unknown
Year of death unknown
People of Asuka-period Japan
7th-century Japanese people
Taihō Code